War of Angels is the second studio album by rock band Pop Evil. The first single, "Last Man Standing", was released in September 2010.  Their second song, "Save the World" was made available for download on their Facebook page on December 20, 2010. "Last Man Standing" is currently inside the Top 20 of the Active Rock Chart. On February 1, 2011, the band announced that the album would be delayed from its original February 8, 2011 date.  "Monster You Made", the second single from the album, was released via the online music service iTunes on June 7, 2011.
The music video for "Boss's Daughter", released on May 25, 2012, featured Mötley Crüe guitarist Mick Mars, who co-wrote the song with the band.
 
The album has since been released on July 5, 2011 via E1 Music. The iTunes-exclusive Deluxe Edition features two bonus tracks not available on other releases.

Track listing
The official track listing was released on the band's YouTube page on February 1, 2011.

Internet exclusives

Charts

Album

Singles

Personnel
Pop Evil
 Leigh Kakaty – lead vocals
 Tony Greve – lead guitar
 Dave Grahs – rhythm guitar, backing vocals
 Matt DiRito – bass, backing vocals
 Dylan Allison – drums

References

External links
 http://popevil.com/news_d.aspx?nid=7930

2011 albums
Pop Evil albums
E1 Music albums
Albums produced by Johnny K